The Fairest of Them All may refer to:

 The Fairest of Them All (album), a 1970 album by Dolly Parton
 "The Fairest of Them All" (The Suite Life of Zack & Cody), a television episode
 "Fairest of Them All", a 2014 fan-produced Star Trek episode